Semirostrum ceruttii is an extinct porpoise that lived between 5 and 1.5 million years ago (Ma), during the Pliocene epoch. The species is highly distinctive due to the extremely long symphysis on the lower jaw, reaching lengths of 85 centimeters (33.46 inches), while that of a modern porpoise are 1–2 centimeters (0.39–0.79 inches) long. The main hypothesis regarding its use is that it probed along the sediment in the murky estuaries and shores of what is now California in search of food, which would easily be scooped up the symphysis and into the jaws. The etymology of the name means "half beak", referring to the upper jaw being half the length of the lower.

References

Pliocene cetaceans
Prehistoric toothed whales
Prehistoric cetacean genera
Fossil taxa described in 2014
Pliocene mammals of North America
Paleontology in California